GROningen MOlecular Simulation (GROMOS) is the name of a force field for molecular dynamics simulation, and a related computer software package. Both are developed at the University of Groningen, and at the Computer-Aided Chemistry Group at the Laboratory for Physical Chemistry at the Swiss Federal Institute of Technology (ETH Zurich). At Groningen, Herman Berendsen was involved in its development.

The united atom force field was optimized with respect to the condensed phase properties of alkanes.

Versions

GROMOS87 
Aliphatic and aromatic hydrogen atoms were included implicitly by representing the carbon atom and attached hydrogen atoms as one group centered on the carbon atom, a united atom force field. The van der Waals force parameters were derived from calculations of the crystal structures of hydrocarbons, and on amino acids using short (0.8 nm) nonbonded cutoff radii.

GROMOS96 
In 1996, a substantial rewrite of the software package was released. The force field was also improved, e.g., in the following way: aliphatic CHn groups were represented as united atoms with van der Waals interactions reparametrized on the basis of a series of molecular dynamics simulations of model liquid alkanes using long (1.4 nm) nonbonded cutoff radii. This version is continually being refined and several different parameter sets are available. GROMOS96 includes studies of molecular dynamics, stochastic dynamics, and energy minimization. The energy component was also part of the prior GROMOS, named GROMOS87. GROMOS96 was planned and conceived during a time of 20 months. The package is made of 40 different programs, each with a different essential function. An example of two important programs within the GROMOS96 are PROGMT, in charge of constructing molecular topology and also PROPMT, changing the classical molecular topology into the path-integral molecular topology.

GROMOS05 
An updated version of the software package was introduced in 2005.

GROMOS11 
The current GROMOS release is dated in May 2011.

Parameter sets 
Some of the force field parameter sets that are based on the GROMOS force field. The A-version applies to aqueous or apolar solutions of proteins, nucleotides, and sugars. The B-version applies to isolated molecules (gas phase).

54 
 54A7 - 53A6 taken and adjusted torsional angle terms to better reproduce helical propensities, altered N–H, C=O repulsion, new CH3 charge group, parameterisation of Na+ and Cl− to improve free energy of hydration and new improper dihedrals.
 54B7 - 53B6 in vacuo taken and changed in same manner as 53A6 to 54A7.

53 
 53A5 - optimised by first fitting to reproduce the thermodynamic properties of pure liquids of a range of small polar molecules and the solvation free enthalpies of amino acid analogs in cyclohexane, is an expansion and renumbering of 45A3.
 53A6 - 53A5 taken and adjusted partial charges to reproduce hydration free enthalpies in water, recommended for simulations of biomolecules in explicit water.

45 
 45A3 - suitable to apply to lipid aggregates such as membranes and micelles, for mixed systems of aliphatics with or without water, for polymers, and other apolar systems that may interact with different biomolecules.
 45A4 - 45A3 reparameterised to improve DNA representation.

43 
 43A1
 43A2

See also 
 GROMACS
 Ascalaph Designer
 Comparison of software for molecular mechanics modeling
 Comparison of force field implementations

References

External links 
 

C++ software
Fortran software
Molecular dynamics software
Force fields